Najibabad (also Romanized as Najībābād) is a village in Qatur Rural District, Qatur District, Khoy County, West Azerbaijan Province, Iran. At the 2006 census, its population was 133, in 23 families.

References 

Populated places in Khoy County